Progressive elaboration is an iterative  process in project management knowledge, which the details of project management plan and amount of information will increase. In this process initial estimates of items such as project scope description, planning, budget, etc. will become more accurate. It also helps the Project team to make the project plan with more details.

See also 
 Rolling-wave planning
 Requirements elicitation

References

Project management